The County Executive of Atlantic County, New Jersey, United States is the chief officer of the county's executive branch and manages the county business, including implementing policy, administering county services, and directing the executive staff. Executives have overseen the administration of county government since the county adopted the form in 1974. The executive offices are located in Atlantic City.

The executive is elected to a four-year term.  there were 180,123 registered voters in the county. Since its first county executive took office in 1975, three individuals have served as the county executive, two of whom have been elected to five consecutive terms of office.

, Atlantic County's executive is Republican Dennis Levinson.

History
Starting in 1967, the county had been governed by a seven-member Board of Chosen Freeholders, all elected at large, having been reduced from a maximum of 35 members that had been reached in 1966, under a form in which each municipality in the county was represented by a freeholder. Under the pre-1967 system, each municipality had freeholders, but in a manner that gave disproportionate representation to smaller municipalities. Corbin City's 238 residents had two representatives, while Atlantic City, with more than 60,000 residents, had four freeholders.

In 1972, the state passed the Optional County Charter Law, which provided for four different manners in which a county could be governed, including by an executive, and administrator, a board president or a county supervisor.

The county established a Charter Study Commission in 1973, which recommended the changes that were ultimately accepted. In November 1974, Atlantic County voters changed the county governmental form under the Optional County Charter Law to the county executive form. The charter provided for an executive directly by the voters and a nine-member Board of Chosen Freeholders, responsible for legislation. The executive is elected to a four-year term and the freeholders are elected to staggered three-year terms, of which four are elected from the county on an at-large basis and five of the freeholders represent equally populated districts.

Atlantic County joins Bergen, Essex, Hudson and Mercer counties as one of the five of 21 New Jersey counties with an elected executive.

County executives

Charles D. Worthington: 1975–1979
Democrat Charles D. Worthington, the first county executive, took office in 1975 while serving his only term in the New Jersey General Assembly. The incoming freeholder board was dominated by Republicans, who held a 7-2 majority, flipping the 5-2 majority that Democrats had held on the freeholder board in place under the previous form of government.

Dick Squires: 1980–1999
Richard "Dick" Squires was born in 1932 in Atlantic City and was raised Egg Harbor Township.

A former Freeholder, Republican Squires defeated Worthington in the 1979 general election. Squires served in office as county executive for 20 years, until deciding in 1999 that he would not run for re-election. Squires won re-election in 1987, defeating Democrat Mary Haynie in an election that had focused on plans for the expansion of Atlantic City International Airport.

Dennis Levinson: 2000–present
Republican Dennis Levinson was raised in Ventnor City and graduated from Atlantic City High School, before earning a bachelor's degree at Glassboro State College (now Rowan University). He taught history for three decades at the Northfield Community Schools.

Prior to his election to the Board of Freeholders he served as a Councilmember in the city of Northfield from 1982 to 1986. First elected as a freeholder in an upset over Joe Messick, Levinson was chosen by his peers as Freeholder Chairman six times.

Levinson was first elected Atlantic County Executive in 1999, winning 53% of the vote and spending $111,000 to defeat Democrat Tom Foley. He was re-elected in 2003 with 83% of the vote and no Republican opposition. In 2007, Levinson won with 65% of the vote, defeating Sheriff Jim McGeittigan, a Republican who changed parties to run for election. In 2011, Levinson again won reelection with two-thirds of the vote, defeating Democrat Clifton Sudler, who had never previously run for elective office. In 2015, Democratic challenger Jim Schroeder dropped out of the race in September, weeks before the election, citing health concerns. Schroeder's name stayed on the ballot and Levinson won with 63% of the vote, by a margin of 28,431 to 16,542.

See also
Bergen County Executive
Essex County Executive
Hudson County Executive
Mercer County Executive

References

1974 establishments in New Jersey
 
County government in New Jersey